Brecksville is a city in Cuyahoga County, Ohio, United States, and a suburb in the Greater Cleveland area. The city's population was 13,635 at the United States 2020 Census.

History
Brecksville was founded in 1811, four years after several men—including Colonel John Breck—purchased the surrounding area.  After the land was surveyed, Seth Payne, one of the surveyors, brought his family and settled in the area in June 1811, and he was soon followed by many other families.  Although Colonel Breck never lived in Brecksville, his three sons did, and members of his family continued to live in Brecksville until 1934, when his great-grandson Dr. Theodore Breck died.  An early historical account of Brecksville was written by William R. Coates and published by The American Historical Society in 1924.

Brecksville was incorporated as a village in 1921, and it gained the status of city in 1960.

Geography
Brecksville is defined by its wooded bluffs and ravines which are a result of the geological confluence of the Glaciated Allegheny Plateau and the Great Lakes Basin. Brecksville's eastern border is traversed by the Cuyahoga River and borders Sagamore Hills Township and Boston Township, southern border Richfield Township (all three townships in Summit County), western border Broadview Heights and northern border Independence.

Parks and recreation
Many neighborhoods in Brecksville are adjacent to the Brecksville Reservation of the Cleveland Metroparks and the Cuyahoga Valley National Park, one of the most visited National Parks in the country. The Brecksville Reservation consists of over 3,000 acres.

Sleepy Hollow Golf Course, consistently ranked as one of the top public golf courses in the United States, is located in Brecksville.

Along with the Cleveland Metroparks and Cuyahoga Valley National Park, Brecksville has a Human Resources and Community Center.

Demographics

As of 2021, the median family income in the city was $132,336 and the per capita income for the average family of three was $172,494. Of the city's population over the age of 25, 59%  hold a bachelor's degree or higher.

2020 census
As of the census of 2020, there were 13,635 people, 5,539 households, and 3,897 families residing in the city. The racial makeup of the city was 90.0% White, 4.2% African American,  4.0% Asian, and 1.5% from two or more races. Hispanic or Latino of any race were .3% of the population.

There were 5,539 households, of which 26.74% had children under the age of 18 living with them, 64.15% were married couples living together. The average household size was 2.43 and the average family size was 3.00.

The median age in the city was 49.3 years. 21.1% of residents were under the age of 18; and 22.4% were 65 years of age or older. The gender makeup of the city was 50.34% male and 49.66% female.

2010 census
As of the census of 2010, there were 13,656 people, 5,349 households, and 3,883 families residing in the city. The racial makeup of the city was 93.3% White, 1.7% African American, 0.1% Native American, 3.4% Asian, 0.3% from other races, and 1.1% from two or more races. Hispanic or Latino of any race were 1.4% of the population.

There were 5,349 households, of which 30.9% had children under the age of 18 living with them, 62.9% were married couples living together, 6.9% had a female householder with no husband present, 2.8% had a male householder with no wife present, and 27.4% were non-families. 24.7% of all households were made up of individuals, and 11.2% had someone living alone who was 65 years of age or older. The average household size was 2.50 and the average family size was 3.00.

The median age in the city was 47.4 years. 22.8% of residents were under the age of 18; 5.3% were between the ages of 18 and 24; 18.1% were from 25 to 44; 36.2% were from 45 to 64; and 17.8% were 65 years of age or older. The gender makeup of the city was 49.9% male and 50.1% female.

Transportation

Highways
Brecksville's major thoroughfares are State Route 21 (Brecksville Road) north and south, and State Route 82 (Royalton Road west of SR 21, Chippewa Road east of SR 21). Interstate 77 and Interstate 80, which carries the Ohio Turnpike, all pass through the city. I-77 has two exits in Brecksville and is the main connection to Cleveland and Akron. The Ohio Turnpike and I-80 are accessible from the I-77/SR 21 interchange with the Turnpike just south of the Brecksville city limits in neighboring Richfield.

Mass transit systems
The city is served by the 77 bus route from the Greater Cleveland Regional Transit Authority, which runs between Brecksville and downtown Cleveland. It is also on the 101 bus route from Akron's METRO Regional Transit Authority, which goes to downtown Akron. A transfer point between the two lines is located in Brecksville at the intersection of Miller Road and Southpoint Boulevard.

Airports
Brecksville is 20 driving miles to Cleveland Hopkins International Airport and 30 miles to Akron-Canton Airport.

Economy
Brecksville has branches of major regional banks, real estate firms, and national financial asset management companies. Companies such as Berkshire Hathaway's Lubrizol Corporation, Duck Creek Energy, Inc., MedData, Inc., True North Energy, LLC, CrossCountry Mortgage, Applied Medical Technology, Inc., The Ahola Corporation, Clinical Technology, Inc., NEC Corporation, Curtiss-Wright Corporation, PNC Financial Services, and AT&T are either headquartered or have sizable operations in the city. The Cleveland Clinic Data Center is located in Brecksville.

In 2018, Brecksville accepted the deed from the Federal Government for the land previously occupied by the U.S. Department of Veterans Affairs Hospital.  The 103-acre site is located at the intersection of I77 and Miller Road. The site is currently being developed by Independence, Ohio based DiGeronimo Companies as a mixed use development called Valor Acres. When completed, the development will include the new DiGeronimo Co. headquarters, the Sherwin Williams research center, offices, apartments and condominiums, a 120-room hotel, and 150k square feet of retail and entertainment.

Education

Public schools
Brecksville is part of the Brecksville–Broadview Heights City School District along with neighboring Broadview Heights. The district had three elementary schools for grades K–4: Hilton Elementary, Highland Drive Elementary, and Chippewa Elementary, all located within Brecksville.  All three closed in 2022 and were consolidated into one school.  Beginning the Fall 2022 school year, the new Brecksville-Broadview Heights Elementary School (Pre-K-5) opened on the Blossom Hill education and recreation complex in Brecksville. The  Brecksville–Broadview Heights Middle School, for grades 6–8, and Brecksville–Broadview Heights High School (BBHHS), for grades 9–12, are located on a campus that spans the border between Brecksville and Broadview Heights. Approximately 4,000 students attend the district at any one time.

Academic rankings 
Brecksville–Broadview Heights School District was ranked the 7th-best in the state of Ohio and the fifth best in the Cleveland-Akron-Canton Consolidated Metropolitan Statistical Area in the 2019 state report cards.

PARCC tests, conducted in 2015 using the new Common Core standards, ranked BBHHS as the 12th-best public high school in the state of Ohio.  Brecksville's three elementary schools also received high rankings in the state's 2015 report card.  Chippewa Elementary ranked 7th in the state, Hilton Elementary ranked 19th, and Highland Drive Elementary ranked significantly above average as well.

In 2015, The Washington Post published the list of America's most challenging high schools. The analysis covered approximately 22,000 U.S. public high schools. The rankings were determined by taking the total number of Advanced Placement, International Baccalaureate and Advanced International Certificate of Education tests given at a school each year and divide by the number of seniors who graduated. BBHHS ranked in the top 4 percent of all high schools in this assessment.

BBHHS has consistently been ranked by U.S. News & World Report magazine as being in the top 5 percent of all high schools in the United States.  Additionally, it was recognized in Newsweek magazine's 2013 list of the top 2000 public high schools in the United States.

In 2008, the U.S. Department of Education recognized BBHHS as an NCLB Blue Ribbon School.  Chippewa and Hilton Elementary Schools have been awarded the "School of Distinction" honor by Ohio's State Superintendent of Schools. BBHHS was a past nominee, by the Ohio Department of Education, for the Blue Ribbon School Award.

Sport championships 
In 2023, the girls' gymnastics team won its 20th consecutive state title and 24th overall.  The boys' wrestling team won the 2015 state championship, placed third at the state level in 2016 and second at the state level in 2023. Additionally, individual wrestlers consistently rank number one in their weight categories at the state level. The girls volleyball team was the state champion in the 2016–2017 school year. The boys football team was the state champion in 1983 and has consistently won their conference championships for many years.

Safety Town Kindergarten Program
In 1972, the Brecksville Police Department began the Safety Town Program. Safety Town is an early education program designed for children entering kindergarten. Children attend Safety Town 2 hours per day for two weeks. During that time they learn about a variety of safety topics taught by Brecksville Police Department staff and a wide variety of guest speakers including but not limited to firemen, nurses, park rangers, and lifeguards.

A miniature town complete with streets, houses, traffic signs and a working traffic light is set up outside the classroom. Children learn traffic signs and rules as they drive peddle cars around the town. They can also park their cars and practice pedestrian safety on the town’s sidewalks and crosswalks.

Private schools
South Suburban Montessori School, located in Brecksville's Blossom Hill Complex, provides a Montessori education to children between 18 months and 14 years of age.

Colleges
Stautzenberger College has a campus in Brecksville. Associate degrees and Board certifications are offered in:
 Veterinary Technology, Animal Welfare, Animal Grooming
 Paralegal Studies
 Diagnostic Cardiovascular Sonography, Diagnostic Medical Sonography

Cuyahoga Community College affiliate Cuyahoga Valley Career Center – School of Nursing offers full and part-time degree programs.

Healthcare
In August 2016, Cleveland's MetroHealth System opened a $48 million, 63,200-square-foot, emergency room-medical center in Brecksville.

Akron Children's Hospital has a branch in Brecksville.

A Cleveland Clinic Express - Urgent Care and Outpatient Center has a facility in Brecksville.

Brecksville Surgery Center, specializing in Ophthalmology surgery, is based in the city.

Recognition

Brecksville won the 2003 "America in Bloom" award and was the 2003 national winner of the "Proven Winners Landscaped Areas Award". Brecksville has won 28 Tree City Year Awards.

In 2014, Brecksville was named by Family Circle magazine one of the top ten U.S. towns to raise families. The magazine stated that Brecksville has top-rated schools and plenty of green space, including Cuyahoga Valley National Park.

Brecksville's Chippewa Garden Club was formed in 1949. The club won the "Garden Club of the Year" award from the Garden Clubs of Ohio eight times since 1971, most recently in 2018. The club also won the 2014 "Historic Preservation" Award for its historic park preservation project.

In 2019, Brecksville was named Ohio's safest area by the National Council for Home Safety and Security. The organization used recent FBI statistics.

Culture
The 2023 Tom Hanks' film A Man Called Otto included the Academy Award-winning actor's son, Truman Hanks, was partially filmed at the Cuyahoga Valley Scenic Railroad's Brecksville Station on Riverview Road.

Brecksville was cited by Soviet filmmaker Lev Kuleshov as the hometown of his protagonist, Mr. West in his 1924 comedy The Extraordinary Adventures of Mr. West in the Land of the Bolsheviks.

The Brecksville Theatre, with performances held in the Old Town Hall, was conceived on July 1, 2017, as a product of the merger of two longstanding Brecksville theatre groups:
 Brecksville Little Theatre (BLT) formed in 1941 and incorporated as a non-profit community organization in 1949 under charter by the State of Ohio. With a rich history of community theatre, BLT showcased many performances including the 1951 comedy “Here Today” directed by nearby Shaker Heights native Paul Newman.
 Brecksville Theater on the Square (BTOTS) was founded in 1975. Besides family theater, it arranged drama classes and programs for students, pre-school through adults.

The Brecksville Center for the Arts is a non-profit, multidisciplinary art center.

Official(s) 
Jerry N. Hruby was elected to his ninth term as mayor of Brecksville which began on January 2, 2020.  Mayor Hruby also serves as the city's Safety Director. In 2011 the Governor of Ohio appointed Hruby to the Ohio Turnpike and Infrastructure Commission (OTIC). He currently is serving as chairman of the commission.

Notable people

Government - Executive, Judicial, Legislative

 Pamela Barker – United States district judge of the United States District Court for the Northern District of Ohio

Cinema, radio, television and theater
 Ryan Dunn – American stunt performer, television personality, comedian, actor, writer, musician – buried in Brecksville, Ohio Cemetery 
 Gus Heege – 19th-century playwright and actor
 Ann Liguori – Sports radio and television broadcaster, graduated from Brecksville-Broadview Heights High School
 George Veras – Emmy Award winning Television producer

Authors, poets and writers
 Eunice Gibbs Allyn – Late 19th, early 20th century American correspondent, author, and artist
 Florence Morse Kingsley – Late 19th, early 20th-century writer of popular and religious fiction
 June Kronholz – Washington D.C. Bureau Deputy Chief of The Wall Street Journal'. Graduate of Brecksville-Broadview Heights High School.
 Constance Laux – Mystery and Romance novelist
 John O'Brien- American author.
 Kathryn Reiss – author of award-winning children's and young adult fiction. Graduate of Brecksville-Broadview Heights High School.
 Joshua Stacher – political scientist and scholar of Middle East politics, authoritarianism, and social movements.

Sports
 John Adams – Cleveland Guardians sports superfan
 Tom Brown – professional football player in the National Football League (NFL)
 Matt Cross – Pro wrestler
 Carol Dewey – college volleyball coach at Purdue University
 Steve Gillespie – Professional Arena Soccer League player and graduate of Brecksville-Broadview Heights High School
 Eric Musselman – NBA coach and graduate of Brecksville-Broadview Heights High School
 Mike Rose – professional football player and graduate of Brecksville-Broadview Heights High School
 Scott Roth – professional basketball player in the National Basketball Association (NBA) and graduate of Brecksville-Broadview Heights High School
 Mark Schulte – professional soccer player in Major League Soccer
 Charlie Sifford – Professional golfer
 Ed Sustersic – professional football player in the NFL
 Tom Tupa – professional football player in the NFL who lives in Brecksville and graduated from Brecksville-Broadview Heights High School
 Christen Westphal – professional soccer player in the National Women's Soccer League

See also
 The  Colson House, built c. 1838 by Bolter and Harriet (Waite) Colson

References

External links

 City of Brecksville
 The Encyclopedia of Cleveland History

1811 establishments in Ohio
Cities in Ohio
Cities in Cuyahoga County, Ohio
Cleveland metropolitan area
Populated places established in 1811